Mohammad Zain bin Mohd Saidin (born February 23, 1984) is a Malaysian actor and a model. He is best known as the character Henry Middleton on the Astro TVIQ series Oh My English!

Career

Zain has been involved in the acting world for a long time, though it is only in recent years that he had taken on more prominent roles in various productions. He has acted in various dramas, amongst others Kiah Pekasam, Awan Dania 3 and Gemersik Kalbu.

In 2012, he joined the cast of the series Oh My English! (a language education comedy akin to Extr@) on Astro TVIQ, taking on the role of the main character Henry Middleton, the half-British English teacher from the United Kingdom.

Early life

Zain was born on 23 February 1984 and comes from Bangsar, Kuala Lumpur. He is the youngest brother of four siblings and has a mixed Malay-English parentage. His sister Sasha Saidin is also an actress and singer for already defunct girls band in the 90's, Elite.

Prior to joining the entertainment industry in his mid-20s, Zain worked as a personal trainer.

Personal life

Zain married actress Rozita Che Wan on 13 December 2013. The couple have a daughter born in 2014.

Filmography

Films

Television series

Telemovies

Television

Music video

References

External links 
 Zain Saidin Sangkal Rancang Gosip Cinta Untuk Popular Oleh WAHIDUZZAMA 

Malaysian male actors
1984 births
Living people
Malaysian people of Malay descent
21st-century Malaysian male actors
Malaysian television personalities
Malaysian people of English descent
People from Kuala Lumpur
Malaysian Muslims